Skidegate   is a Haida community in  in British Columbia, Canada.

Skidegate, which is located on Skidegate Indian Reserve No. 1 and was formerly home to the Skidegate Mission is also the northern terminal for the BC Ferries service between Graham Island and Alliford Bay on Moresby Island.

According to tradition, the village was named after an earlier village chief, Sg̱iida-gidg̱a Iihllngas = "Son of the Chiton” whose name late 18th-century traders in sea otter pelts recorded as Skidegate. Between 1790 and 1820 the community was a hub for the exploitation of sea otter furs.

Skidegate is home to a number of totem poles:
T'anuu'llnagaay (Tanu) by Giitsxaa
Hlknul'llnagaay (Cumshewa) by Gidansda Guujaaw
HlGaagilda'llnagaay (Skidegate) by Norman Price
K'uuna'llnagaay (Skedans) by Jim Hart
Ts'aahj'llnagaay (Chaatl) by Garner Moody
Eagle and Bear Mother by Dick Bellis
Dogfish, by Bill Reid
Unity Pole
Chief Skedans Jimmy Wilson Memorial by  Bert Wilson and Joe Mander
Strongman by Tim Boyko, Skaadgaa Naay elementary school
Chief Wiiganaad Sid Crosby Naa'uuwans (chieftanship) by Tim Boyko and Jason Goetzinger
Weeping Woman of Taanu by Norman Price St
Chieftanship Pole to Honour Matriarch Barb Wilson
SGang Gwaay'llnagaay (Ninstints) by Tim Boyko
Kaay Watchman's pole

The Haida Heritage Centre is located in Skidegate along the town's eastern boundary.

See also

 Council of the Haida Nation
 Skidegate Band Council
 List of Haida villages

References

External links
 Skidegate website
 BC Ferries schedule for Skidegate–Alliford Bay

Unincorporated settlements in British Columbia
Haida villages
Graham Island